Droceloncia is a genus of plant of the family Euphorbiaceae first described as a genus in 1959. It contains only one known species, Droceloncia rigidifolia, native to Madagascar and to the nearby island of Mayotte.

References

Pycnocomeae
Monotypic Euphorbiaceae genera
Taxa named by Henri Ernest Baillon